Douglas "Bakie" Goodman (born February 28, 1995) is an American soccer player.

Career

College
Goodman spent his entire college career at Georgetown University between 2013 and 2016, where he made 80 appearances, scoring 7 goals and tallying 12 assists in his town with the Hoyas.

In 2014, Goodman played with USL League Two side IMG Academy Bradenton.

Professional
Goodman was selected in the third round (56th overall) of the 2017 MLS SuperDraft by Seattle Sounders FC. He trained with Seattle's USL affiliate Seattle Sounders FC 2, but was released a week before the beginning of the season.

Following his release by Seattle, Goodman joined NPSL side Detroit City FC for their 2017 season.

On February 23, 2018, Goodman signed for USL side Pittsburgh Riverhounds SC.

Goodman rejoined Detroit City FC on 4 February 2019.

References

External links

 
 

1995 births
Living people
American soccer players
Georgetown Hoyas men's soccer players
IMG Academy Bradenton players
Detroit City FC players
Pittsburgh Riverhounds SC players
Association football midfielders
Soccer players from Florida
Seattle Sounders FC draft picks
USL League Two players
USL Championship players
Sportspeople from Sarasota, Florida
National Premier Soccer League players
National Independent Soccer Association players